Maria Konnikova (βορν 1984) is a Russian-American writer with a Ph.D. in psychology from Columbia University. Konnikova has worked as a television producer, written for several magazines and online publications, and written three New York Times best-seller list books.

Early life

Maria Konnikova was born in Moscow, Russia, to Jewish parents. She was four years old when her family emigrated to the United States and settled in the state of Massachusetts.

Education
Konnikova attended Acton-Boxborough Regional High School in Massachusetts.
After graduating from high school, Konnikova attended Harvard University, where she graduated with a B.A. in  psychology and creative writing. While at Harvard, Konnikova was mentored by Steven Pinker.

She earned her Ph.D. in psychology from Columbia University in 2013. under Walter Mischel.

Career

Writing 
Following her B.A., Konnikova worked as a producer for the Charlie Rose Show, where she helped set up the segment "Brain Series". She also wrote the "Literally Psyched" column for Scientific American and the psychology blog "Artful Choice" for Big Think. In April 2013, she had her article on uncertainty in decision making was published in The New Yorker,  where she continues to contribute.

Konnikova's book was Mastermind: How to Think Like Sherlock Holmes. She was introduced to the Sherlock Holmes character at a young age, when her father read Arthur Conan Doyle’s stories to her.

Her book, The Confidence Game, published in 2016 in the crime and punishment category

Her third book, The Biggest Bluff, in 2020, follows her active participation into the world of poker.

Konnikova makes regular appearances on The Gist podcast in her own segment, "Is that bullshit?". In early 2017, she published a 10-part podcast about con-artists and the lives they ruin, called The Grift.

Poker 

Konnikova has said that she became interested in poker after reading John von Neumann’s work on game theory. She described it as a way to examine the mind’s responses to conditions that involve both skill and chance. Konnikova told The New York Times, "When I started this, I didn’t know how many cards were in a deck. I hate casinos. I have zero interest in gambling."

In the late summer of 2016, she made contact with Erik Seidel, who agreed to become her coach for her goal of spending a year as a competitive poker player.

Her first major tournament, in April 2017, was the PokerStars tournament 2017 in Monte Carlo. In January 2018, she won the PCA National event at the PokerStars Caribbean Adventure No-Limit Hold'em Championship, winning $84,600. The win also came with a Platinum Pass worth $30,000 to the PokerStars Players Championship in January 2019. Her total earnings prior to the event were about $30,000.

After that 2018 win, Konnikova decided to delay work on her book, The Biggest Bluff, to compete in more tournaments with higher stakes. She took up professional poker playing full-time. Beginning in the summer of 2018, she became affiliated with PokerStars, an online gaming site; in June 2018, she became a PokerStars "Ambassador" with PokerStars sponsoring her in professional tournaments.
 
In November 2019, Konnikova and PokerStars “parted ways”.

Awards 

Konnikova's book The Confidence Game was awarded the 2016 Robert P. Balles Prize by the Committee for Skeptical Inquiry.
 The Best American Science and Nature Writing for her article "Altered Tastes," about Heston Blumenthal

Selected bibliography
 Mastermind: How to Think Like Sherlock Holmes, Viking, 3 January 2013, 
 The Confidence Game: Why We Fall for It . . . Every Time, Viking, 12 January 2016, 
 The Biggest Bluff: How I Learned to Pay Attention, Master Myself, and Win, Penguin Press, 23 June 2020,

References

External links

 Official website
 Scientific American column 
 The Grift podcast
 Maria Konnikova Poker Interview
 Tournament poker results

1984 births
Living people
American women writers
Harvard University alumni
Teachers College, Columbia University alumni
American people of Russian-Jewish descent
American women journalists
American poker players
Female poker players
Jewish American writers
21st-century American Jews
21st-century American women